Sidhant Kapoor is an Indian classical musician. Born in a family of musicians in India, he learned from and was inspired by his grandfather legendary singer Mahendra Kapoor and father singer Ruhan Kapoor. He has learnt Indian Classical from one of the most eminent Indian Classical Music teachers of India, Pandit Murli Manohar Shukla ji as well as trained under jazz exponent Sir Xavier Fernandes. He started composing from an early age for music companies in the United Kingdom and the United States and his music has used by reputed television channels like BBC, MTV, Discovery, ITV1, Sky, Animal Planet as well as Netherland films, New Zealand films, Norwegian films, Australian films, Polish films etc. His music featured in the award winning Spanish film Un Espejo En El Cielo, which was directed by Oscar Nominee Icíar Bollaín.

Sidhant completed his post-graduate studies in Music Composition at the Trinity Laban conservatoire of Music & Dance, where he was working on incorporating Indian music elements in his compositions for western instruments. His experiments include writing graphic scores which could be played in various ways depending on the raga(Indian scale) chosen by the performer. He won competitions like the Harp-Composers competition and the reputed Daryl Runswick competition which earned his composition a premiere at the National Maritime Museum. His composition based on Ansel Adams' photography was praised by Dr. Michael Adams (son of Ansel Adams) and was chosen as the winning composition. One of the projects he worked on during his time at Trinity was an opera based on an Indian mythological story - 'Birth Of Ganesha' which was appreciated by prominent classical composers Dr. Deirdre Gribbin and Dr. Stephen Montague. His music was also used by a documentary on India by BBC.

References

Living people
Indian male classical musicians
1984 births